Arbyrd is a small town in southeast Dunklin County, Missouri, United States. The population was 404 at the 2020 census. The town was officially incorporated in 1919.

History
A post office called Arbyrd has been in operation since 1911. The town's name is a contraction of A. R. Byrd, a land and cattle speculator from the St. Louis area who lived near San Antonio, Texas, at the time he purchased just over 4000 acres of mostly hardwood timber land just to the north of where the town was originally platted.

Geography
The city is concentrated along Missouri Route 108, with its municipal boundaries stretching southward to the road's junction with Missouri Route 164. U.S. Route 412 passes just to the west.  Cardwell lies along Route 164 to the west, and Hornersville lies along Route 164 to the east.  Senath lies to the northeast along US 412. The Missouri-Arkansas state line lies three miles to the south along Route 108 (the road becomes Arkansas Highway 77 at the border).

Climate

Demographics

2000 census
As of the census of 2000, there were 528 people, 230 households, and 143 families residing in the town. The population density was 528.8 people per square mile (203.9/km2). There were 257 housing units at an average density of 257.4 per square mile (99.2/km2). The racial makeup of the town was 98.48% White, 0.19% African American, 0.19% Native American, and 1.14% from two or more races. Hispanic or Latino of any race were 1.14% of the population.

There were 230 households, out of which 23.5% had children under the age of 18 living with them, 48.7% were married couples living together, 8.3% had a female householder with no husband present, and 37.4% were non-families. 34.8% of all households were made up of individuals, and 17.0% had someone living alone who was 65 years of age or older. The average household size was 2.30 and the average family size was 2.91.

In the town the population was spread out, with 24.1% under the age of 18, 7.4% from 18 to 24, 23.9% from 25 to 44, 27.1% from 45 to 64, and 17.6% who were 65 years of age or older. The median age was 42 years. For every 100 females, there were 97.0 males. For every 100 females age 18 and over, there were 96.6 males.

The median income for a household in the town was $25,438, and the median income for a family was $28,929. Males had a median income of $24,432 versus $16,563 for females. The per capita income for the town was $12,504. About 14.3% of families and 23.8% of the population were below the poverty line, including 28.8% of those under age 18 and 28.7% of those age 65 or over.

2010 census
As of the census of 2010, there were 509 people, 198 households, and 124 families residing in the city. The racial makeup of the city was 94.30% White, 0.20% Native American, 4.72% from other races, and 0.79% from two or more races. Hispanic or Latino of any race were 8.25% of the population.

There were 198 households, of which 35.4% had children under the age of 18 living with them, 43.4% were married couples living together, 9.6% had a female householder with no husband present, 9.6% had a male householder with no wife present, and 37.4% were non-families. 31.8% of all households were made up of individuals, and 17.2% had someone living alone who was 65 years of age or older. The average household size was 2.57 and the average family size was 3.24.

The median age in the city was 39.4 years. 27.7% of residents were under the age of 18; 7.3% were between the ages of 18 and 24; 22.8% were from 25 to 44; 23.6% were from 45 to 64; and 18.7% were 65 years of age or older. The gender makeup of the city was 49.3% male and 50.7% female.

Arts and culture 

The Missouri Bootheel was the home of two members of The Kentucky Headhunters, Doug and Ricky Phelps. They grew up in Cardwell and Arbyrd and obtained their education from the Southland C-9 school district. Doug and Ricky were both members of the Headhunters who then left to form their own band called - Brother Phelps.

Education
Arbyrd has a public library, a branch of the Dunklin County Library.

References

External links

Cities in Dunklin County, Missouri
Populated places established in 1919
Cities in Missouri